Abnormal or discontinuous grain growth, also referred to as exaggerated or secondary recrystallisation grain growth, is a grain growth phenomenon through which certain energetically favorable grains (crystallites) grow rapidly in a matrix of finer grains resulting in a bimodal grain size distribution.

In ceramic materials this phenomenon can result in the formation of elongated prismatic, acicular (needle-like) grains in a densified matrix with implications for improved fracture toughness through the impedance of crack propagation.

Mechanisms 

Abnormal grain growth (AGG) is encountered in metallic or ceramic systems exhibiting one or more of several characteristics.
 Secondary phase inclusions, precipitates or impurities above a certain threshold concentration.
 High anisotropy in interfacial energy （solid-liquid））or grain boundary energy (solid-solid) in bulk materials.
 Highly anisotropic surface energy in thin film materials.
 High chemical inequilibrium.

Although many gaps remain in our fundamental understanding of AGG phenomena, in all cases abnormal grain growth occurs as a result of very high local rates of interface migration and is enhanced by the localised formation of liquid at grain boundaries.

Significance 

Abnormal grain growth is often recorded as an undesirable phenomenon occurring during the sintering of ceramic materials as rapidly growing grains may lower the hardness of the bulk material through Hall Petch type effects. However, the controlled introduction of dopants to bring about controlled AGG may be used to impart fibre-toughening in ceramic materials. In piezoelectric ceramics the occurrence of AGG may bring about the degradation of piezoelectric effect and thus in these systems AGG is avoided.

Example systems 

Rutile (TiO2) frequently exhibits a prismatic or acicular growth habit. In the presence of alkali dopants or a solid state ZrSiO4 dopant, rutile has been observed to crystallise from a parent anatase phase material in the form of abnormally large grains existing in a matrix of finer equiaxed anatase or rutile grains.
 Alumina, Al2O3 with silica and/or yttria dopants/impurities has been reported to exhibit undesirable AGG.
BaTiO3 barium titanate with an excess of TiO2 is known to exhibit abnormal grain growth with profound consequences on this materials piezoelectric performance.
Tungsten carbide has been reported to exhibit AGG of faceted grains in the presence of a liquid cobalt-containing phase at grain boundaries
Silicon nitride (Si3N4) may exhibit AGG depending on the size distribution of β-phase material in an α-Si3N4 precursor. This type of grain growth is of importance in the toughening of silicon nitride materials
Silicon carbide has been shown to exhibit improved fracture toughness as the result of AGG processes yielding elongated crack tip/wake bridging grains, with consequences for applications in ballistic armor. This type of crack-bridging based enhanced fracture toughness of ceramic materials exhibiting AGG is consistent with reported morphological effects on crack propagation in ceramics
Strontium barium niobate, used for electro-optics and dielectric applications is known to exhibit AGG with significant consequences on the material's electronic performance
Calcium titanate (CaTiO3, perovskite) systems doped with BaO have been observed to exhibit AGG without the formation of liquid as the result of polytype interfaces between solid phases

See also 

 Crystallites
 Fractography
 Grain boundary
 Metallurgy
 Micrography
 Micrograph
 Microstructure
 Sintering

References

External links 
 Abnormal Grain Growth by Cyclic Heat Treatment
 University of Virginia, Surface Energy

Materials science
Crystallography
Mineralogy concepts